In military terms, 131st Division or 131st Infantry Division may refer to:

 131st Division (1st Formation)(People's Republic of China), 1948–1953
 131st Division (2nd Formation)(People's Republic of China), 1964–1985
 131st Infantry Division (Wehrmacht)
 131st Division (Imperial Japanese Army)
 Italian 131st Armoured Division
 131st Infantry Division (Philippines)
 131st Motor Rifle Division (Soviet Union)